The Ose is a torrent in Umbria, central Italy.

Its spring is on the comune of Spello, in the territory of Umbria. Ose is affluent of Topino. After passing through the comuni of Spello, Assisi and Bettona, it joins the Topino (Tiber basin).

Rivers of the Province of Perugia
Rivers of Italy